The 2021 Open Quimper Bretagne was a professional tennis tournament played on hard courts. It was the eleventh edition of the tournament which was part of the 2021 ATP Challenger Tour. It took place in Quimper, France between 25 and 31 January 2021.

Singles main-draw entrants

Seeds

1 Rankings as of 18 January 2021.

Other entrants
The following players received wildcards into the singles main draw:
  Arthur Cazaux
  Evan Furness
  Constant Lestienne

The following players received entry from the qualifying draw:
  Antoine Cornut Chauvinc
  Tristan Lamasine
  Illya Marchenko
  Kacper Żuk

Champions

Singles

 Sebastian Korda def.  Filip Horanský 6–1, 6–1.

Doubles

 Grégoire Barrère /  Albano Olivetti def.  James Cerretani /  Marc-Andrea Hüsler 5–7, 7–6(9–7), [10–8].

References

2021 ATP Challenger Tour
2021
2021 in French tennis
January 2021 sports events in France